The Constitution Act, 1886 (UK), 58 & 59 Vict, c 35, (the Act) is an Act of the Parliament of the United Kingdom and forms part of the Constitution of Canada. It was originally known as the British North America Act, 1886, but it was renamed by the Constitution Act, 1982.

Section 1 of the Constitution Act, 1886 provides that "the Parliament of Canada may...make provision for the representation in the Senate and House of Commons, or in either of them, of any territories which for the time being form part of the Dominion of Canada, but are not included in any Province thereof."

Section 2 of the Act clarifies that Parliament can by providing for the representation of the territories in the Senate increase the normal and maximum total number of Senators under the Constitution Act, 1867, and increase the number of members of the House of Commons.

There are currently three territories which are part of Canada, but which are not part of any province: the Northwest Territories, Nunavut and Yukon.

Territorial representation in Parliament 

Each territory is currently represented by one member of the Senate and one member of the House of Commons. This is in spite of their small populations relative to the provinces and indeed, relative to nearly all federal electoral districts. In 1987, the Chief Justice of the Supreme Court of British Columbia noted that "representation for the territories [in the House of Commons] has never been based strictly upon population".

The Northwest Territories and Yukon have been represented in the Senate since 1975 and Nunavut has been represented in the Senate since its creation in 1999.

The Yukon has been represented in the House of Commons since 1902. The Northwest Territories and the Yukon were represented by the same member of the House of Commons between 1949 and 1952. After the 1952 election, the western portion of the Northwest Territories was represented by its own member; after the 1979 election, an additional member was added to the House of Commons to represent the eastern portion of the Northwest Territories. Nunavut, which was created from the eastern portion of the Northwest Territories, has been represented in the House of Commons since its creation in 1999.

History 

The Constitution Act, 1886 was enacted at the request of the government of Canada "on the basis of a formal address by both Houses of Parliament". This was in accordance with the precedent set concerning the Constitution Act, 1871.

The Constitution Act, 1915, which increased the representation of Alberta, British Columbia, Manitoba and Saskatchewan in the Senate, and established the Senate floor rule according to which a province cannot have fewer members of the House of Commons than it has Senators, provided that it does not "affect the powers of the Canadian Parliament under the Constitution Act, 1886". (Like the Constitution Act, 1886, the Constitution Act, 1915 was enacted without provincial consultation or consent.) The Senate floor rule is now reflected in paragraph 41(b) of the Constitution Act, 1982.

In 1979, in the Reference re Authority of Parliament in relation to the Upper House (better known as the Upper House Reference), the Supreme Court of Canada noted that the actual granting of representation in the Senate and the House of Commons to the territories by virtue of section 1 of the Constitution Act, 1886 "did not in any substantial way affect federal-provincial relationships". In their dissenting opinion in the Reference re Resolution to amend the Constitution (better known as the Patriation Reference) in 1981, Chief Justice Laskin and Justices Estey and McIntyre noted that the Constitution Act, 1886 was enacted "without provincial consultation and consent" despite its effects on provincial interests. The judges were presumably referring to the risk that Parliament would use the power to dilute the provincial representation in the Senate, undermining one of its fundamental features.

Senator Eugene Forsey seems to share the dissenting judges' concern. This concern was noted by W.H.P. Clement as early as 1892; Clement warned that "it is in the power of the Dominion government to swamp the Senate, so long as the additional members are appointed to represent the [territories]". James Ross Hurley, a former senior public servant, noted that "a radical increase in territorial senators could, at some point, be challenged as a violation of the federal principle". More recently, Jesse Hartery warned that "any increase to the number of seats provided to the territories...may result in major distortions to the principle of representation by population".

Overlap with other powers 

Parliament's power under section 1 of the Constitution Act, 1886 overlaps with Parliament's broader power to make laws in relation to the "amendment...of the Constitution of Canada" (subject to certain exceptions) under subsection 91(1) of the British North America Act, 1867. That power was conferred to Parliament by section 1 of the British North America Act, 1949 (No. 2) and repealed by subsection 53(1) of and the Schedule to the Constitution Act, 1982.  Subsection 91(1) of the British North America Act, 1867 has since been replaced by section 44 of the Constitution Act, 1982.

Relationship with democratic rights 

Parliament's power to "make provision for the representation in the...House of Commons...of any territor[y]" is likely limited by the democratic rights guaranteed in the Canadian Charter of Rights and Freedoms. Section 3 of the Charter guarantees to Canadian citizens residing in each territory "right to vote in an election of members of the House of Commons...and to be qualified for membership therein". Section 3 applies to "the Parliament...of Canada in respect of all matters within the authority of Parliament including all matters relating to the Yukon Territory and Northwest Territories" (emphasis added) by virtue of paragraph 32(1)(a) of the Charter. Jesse Hartery suggests that section 3 of the Charter requires that each territory be represented by its own member of the House of Commons.

French version 

Since the Constitution Act, 1886 was enacted in English, there is no official French version of the Act. Section 55 of the Constitution Act, 1982 requires the Minister of Justice to prepare a translation of the Act and that it be brought forward for enactment. Although a translation was prepared in 1990, it has not been brought forward for enactment.

Proposed amendments 

The Constitution Act, 1886 would not have been repealed by the Victoria Charter or the Meech Lake Accord, two unsuccessful attempts to reform the Constitution of Canada. A third attempt, the Charlottetown Accord, would have (at least impliedly) repealed the Constitution Act, 1886 in part and added a paragraph 21(1)(b) to the Constitution Act, 1867, which would have provided that "one [Senator] shall be elected for each territory, namely the Yukon Territory and the Northwest Territories". The Accord also proposed subsection 21(2), which would have provided that "where a new province is established from the Yukon Territory or the Northwest Territories, the new province shall be entitled to the same representation in the Senate as the territory had."

See also 
Full text of the Constitution Act, 1886.

French version of the Constitution Act, 1886 proposed by the French Constitutional Drafting committee. An alternative French version was published in the Revised Statutes of Canada in 1985 and reprinted in the Revised Statutes of Ontario in 1990.

References

Constitution of Canada
Acts of the Parliament of the United Kingdom concerning Canada